Kōichi Katō is the name of two House of Representatives of Japan's members:
Koichi Kato (LDP) (加藤紘一, 1939–2016), Japanese politician
Koichi Kato (DPJ) (加藤公一, born 1964), Japanese politician